Hillgrove High School is a public high school in Powder Springs, Georgia, United States, and is the fifteenth high school of the Cobb County School District. The school's mascot is the Hawk.

History
The land was donated by Harry Hill and Harriet Hargrove Hill to Young Harris College and then sold to the Cobb County Board of education, by the university. The Hills purchased the land in 1952 to raise cattle and Tennessee Walking Horses. The Hills give college scholarships to Hillgrove students who excel at their studies.

Academics
Hillgrove High is ranked roughly 32nd-33rd in top public high schools across the state of Georgia with a graduation rate of 94%. The school currently offers over twenty Advanced Placement courses with 55% student participation. The school also offers "Career Tech" pathways, CTAE courses including:

 Programming 
 Engineering Graphics & Design 
 Audio/Video Technology & Film 
 Business Management/Career Technology 
 Culinary Arts 
 Sports & Entertainment 
 Marketing

NJROTC
The Hillgrove High School Naval Junior Reserve Officers' Training Corps. The organization has won numerous accolades and awards since its establishment and commission in 2009 and 2010 respectively. The Orienteering Team has also won two state championships within the past three years and was the national champion team in 2019.

Athletics
A small council of students from neighboring Cobb County schools met to choose Hillgrove's mascot, the hawk. This was chosen due to the many indigenous hawks living around the property upon which Hillgrove was built. The school is home to various athletic teams.

 Baseball
 Basketball
 Cheerleading
 Chess
 Cross Country
 Dance
 Football
 Girls Flag Football
 Golf
 Lacrosse
 Riflery
 Soccer
 Softball
 Swim & Dive
 Tennis
 Track & Field
 Volleyball
 Wrestling

Performing Arts
Hillgrove High School has many notable and accomplished Performing Arts programs, including its jazz band, marching band and drama program.

Jazz Band
Under Director of Bands Jeremy Lumpkin, Hillgrove's Jazz I Band has become renowned state-wide, and will play at the GMEA In-Service Conference in January 2023.

Marching Band 
The Hillgrove Marching Band has held a legacy of success since the school opened in 2006. Once under direction of Chris Ferrell and Patrick Erwin, the band is now under direction of Jeremy Lumpkin. The band marched at the 75th Anniversary Parade of D-Day in 2019, and combined with Kell High School to create Kellgrove, which competed and achieved second place in the Fayette County Marching Band Finals with their show 'Ohana. As of 2022 the band competed at the Jacksonville State Regional BOA Championships with their show Maybe Something Beautiful.

Notable alumni
 Bradley Chubb, NFL outside linebacker
 Kenyan Drake, NFL running back
 Evan Engram, NFL tight end
 Chigoziem Okonkwo, NFL tight end
 Myles Murphy,  Clemson defensive end
 Collin Sexton, NBA Point Guard

References

External links 
 Hillgrove High School
 Cobb County School District

Public high schools in Georgia (U.S. state)
Educational institutions established in 2006
Schools in Cobb County, Georgia
2006 establishments in Georgia (U.S. state)